Patoka is a rural community in the Hastings District and Hawke's Bay Region of New Zealand's North Island. It is located at base of the Kaweka Range and Kaweka Forest Park.

The area has been used for pastoral sheep and dairy farming since the 19th century.

Education

References

Hastings District
Populated places in the Hawke's Bay Region